Geethanjali is a 2014 Indian Telugu comedy horror film directed by debutant Raj Kiran. The film was written by Raj Kiran along with Kona Venkat, who also presented the film. It starring Anjali and Srinivasa Reddy in lead roles. The film's soundtrack and background score were composed by Praveen Lakkaraju. The movie was remade in Kannada as Kathe Chitrakathe Nirdeshana Puttanna (2016). Anjali  received the Nandi Award for Best Actress for her performance at Nandi Awards 2014.

Plot
Srinivas alias Sreenu is a wannabe film director who wants to win a Nandi award for a story he has. He faces many ridicules from different producers, including one who tries to make him adulterate the story and another lady who tells that everybody in her family and outside including cooks and cleaners have to like the story if she has to produce it. He meets a businessman, Ramesh Rao with whom at first he has a fight for being late for an appointment, but eventually gets along with. He narrates the story to him. Rao also wants to do a film which will get a Nandi award as he wants to dedicate it to his father.

In the opening scene in an apartment in Hyderabad, a girl commits suicide. The death appears to be suspicious and it is being investigated by inspector Shravan who at first suspects the security guard, who was the first one to find out about the suicide. The next day, the owner of the house comes with a babaji who takes the spirit of the girl into a lemon but dies in a car accident on the way back. Then Sreenu tells Ramesh Rao about 3 months later. He also tells Ramesh Rao to imagine himself in place of the hero. In a bus from Vijayawada to Hyderabad, the hero meets a girl Anjali on the bus. Both of them become friends during the journey but the next morning, Anjali leaves without Sreenu knowing. After getting down from the bus, Sreenu goes to his friend Madhunandan, and now it is revealed that he had actually come to Hyderabad to meet producer Dil Raju and narrate to him a story he wrote. A house broker gets them a house in the same flat where the suicide took place. After a lot of persuasion, Sreenu agrees to stay there. There he meets Athreya and Arudra who claim to be assistants of Dil Raju although they are not and began to stay with Sreenu and Madhu. That night, the girl in the bus, Anjali comes there as she thought her friends who used to stay there were still there. Sreenu manages to persuade her to come in with a cup of coffee as coffee is her weakness. Soon she becomes a regular guest at the house. One day, two policemen come there and give Sreenu a bundle and tell him to put it in the prohibited room which belongs to the owners of the flat. When he keeps them inside, he sees a picture of Anjali in the room. Sreenu asks Venkatesh, the watchman about the photo and he tells Sreenu that it is a photo of the girl who committed suicide. Sreenu, Athreya and Arudra get frightened out of their wits when Venkatesh tells them that he hasn't seen any girl enter the apartment at night since a week. That night, The doorbell rings again but Sreenu does not open the door. Then next morning, he packs everything that belonged to him and runs away from the apartment. It is now revealed that whatever Sreenu told Ramesh Rao is his real-life story. Sreenu tells Rao that he just wanted to tell the story to somebody and he doesn't want to actually make it into a movie. And saying so, he leaves from there. On the way back, Sreenu encounters a friend of Anjali whose photo he had seen in the room. When he inquires with the girl, he finds out that Anjali had a boyfriend, Madhunandan who was in jail as people believed him to be the reason Anjali committed suicide. At first, Sreenu thinks it is his friend, Madhu but later finds out it is not. Madhu takes Sreenu, Athreya and Arudra to his uncle Shaitan Raj, a psychiatrist. Raj helps the three of them and they find out it is just a man who has been hiding there as he thought he will get a free house if they also run away. The 4 of them encourage the man to work for a living. That night, Anjali comes there to tell them the truth. She reveals to them that her name is Ushanjali and the one who died is her twin sister, Geethanjali. Geethanjali was in love with Madhu, but her boss, who is surprisingly Ramesh Rao, rapes her after she refuses to marry him. She commits suicide and Rao has Madhu blamed for the death. The gang decide to take revenge on Rao. Sreenu tells Rao that he went back to the flat and the girl's spirit was coming that night to tell him who killed her. Ramesh Rao tells Sreenu he too will come along and hear the spirit. Sreenu and the gang send Ushanjali to Shaitan Raj to take training of the language and body language of devils so that she can act as Geethanjali. That night, at Sreenu's house, Ramesh Rao reveals he knows everything and that the spirit who has come now is not Geethanjali but Ushanjali. In a fit of rage, Ushanjali kills Ramesh Rao and then goes away. Just after she leaves, she returns and apologises for being late and that she is ready. It is now revealed that Ushanjali got locked inside her house after her door got jammed and that the one who came was the real Geethanjali (who escaped from the lemon after it broke open). The ending scene shows all of them together celebrating Geethanjali's boyfriend, Madhunandan's birthday and after that a song.

Cast

Production

Debutant director Raj Kiran, announced his first film featuring Anjali and Srinivasa Reddy. He titled the horror comedy women-centric film as 'Geethanjali.The first look launch event of the movie was held in Hyderabad and V. V. Vinayak, who has attended as the chief guest, launched the first look.

Soundtrack

Reception 

The movie gained positive reviews all over and a box office hit with critics praising Anjali's performance. She received Nandi Award for Best Actress, SICA Award for Best Telugu Actress. Following the success of Geethanjali, she received many offers of women-centric films which she turned down all.

Awards and honours

References

External links
 

2010s Telugu-language films
2014 films
2014 comedy horror films
Indian comedy horror films
Twins in Indian films
Telugu films remade in other languages